is a town in Hidaka District, Wakayama Prefecture, Japan. , the town had an estimated population of 9,556 in 4246 households and a population density of 29 persons per km².

Geography 
It is about 35 km east–west and about 10 km north–south. The Hidaka River runs through the central part, and about 90% of the total area is forest. It occupies about 7% of the total area of Wakayama Prefecture and is the third largest municipality in terms of area in the prefecture.

Neighboring municipalities
Wakayama Prefecture
Gobō
Tanabe
Hidaka
Inami
Hirogawa
Aridagawa

Climate
Hidakagawa has a Humid subtropical climate (Köppen Cfa) characterized by warm summers and cool winters with light to no snowfall. The area is subject to typhoons in summer.

Demographics
Per Japanese census data, the population of Hidakagawa has been decreasing over the past 60 years.

History
The area of the modern town of Hidakagawa was within ancient Kii Province, and was the location of Tedori Castle during the Sengoku period. The villages of Hayaso,  Nyu and Yata were established with the creation of the modern municipalities system on April 1, 1889. These villages merged on January 1, 1955 to form the town of Kawabe. Kawabe merged on May 1, 2005 with the villages of  Nakatsu and Miyama to form the town of Hidakagawa.

Government
Hidakagawa has a mayor-council form of government with a directly elected mayor and a unicameral city council of 12 members. Hidakagawa collectively with the other municipalities of Hidaka District, contributes three members to the Wakayama Prefectural Assembly. In terms of national politics, the town is part of Wakayama 3rd district of the lower house of the Diet of Japan.

Economy
The economy of Hidakagawa is centered on horticulture and agriculture. The town is noted for its mandarin orangess, and for the production of binchōtan charcoal.

Education
Hidakagawa has nine public elementary schools and four public middle schools operated by the town government, and two public high schools operated by the Wakayama Prefectural Board of Education.

Transportation

Railway 
 JR West – Kisei Main Line

Highways 
  Yuasa-Gobo Road

Local attractions
Dōjō-ji, famous temple and the setting for the Noh play Dōjōji

References

External links

Hidakagawa official website 

Towns in Wakayama Prefecture
Hidakagawa, Wakayama